Thinking in Textures is the debut extended play (EP) by Australian musician Chet Faker. It was released on 23 March 2012 by Opulent and Remote Control Records.

The album won Best Independent Single/EP at the Australian Independent Records Awards.

Track listing

Personnel

Technical
 Chet Faker — production
 Andrei Eremin — mastering

Visuals and imagery
 Christopher Doyle — art direction, design
 Jefton Sungkar — photography

Charts

Release history

References 

2012 debut EPs
Chet Faker albums